Heiligenmoschel is a municipality in the district of Kaiserslautern, in Rhineland-Palatinate, western Germany.

References

Kaiserslautern (district)